Dana Hills High School is a high school in Dana Point, California opened in 1973. The school's enrollment of nearly 3,000 students is drawn from the nearby communities of Laguna Niguel, Dana Point, Capistrano Beach, and San Juan Capistrano.

When Dana Hills was built in 1972–73, the area was an unincorporated area of Orange County.  The school was named for its hilltop location over the unincorporated village of Dana Point, as well as the tip of the hill projecting south into the Pacific Ocean as the Dana Point headland.  The school later became a part of the City of Dana Point, when the city was incorporated in 1989.

The principal is Brad Baker.

STAR Testing
Dana Hills' Academic Performance Index (API) for the year of 2007 was 824.

Recent scores

Advanced Placement
Dana Hills offers a wide array of Advanced Placement (AP) classes. These AP classes include Calculus AB, Calculus BC, Statistics, Biology, Chemistry, Environmental Science, Literature, Language and Composition, Music Theory, Art History, Psychology, Spanish IV, French IV, European History, United States History, World History, Government/Politics, and Computer Science A. All AP classes offer a “grade bump” making a 5.0 GPA possible in that class exclusively.

Newspaper
The Dana Hills newspaper, originally called the Dolphin Dispatch from 1973 to 1992, now simply known as The Paper (stylized as "THE PAPER"), is produced by a staff of roughly 20 students. Ten newspapers are produced each school year. It features five sections: news, feature, opinion, entertainment, and sports.

In May 2019, the newspaper went digital with a new website (www.dhhsthepaper.com) created by a staff member.

HMO
Dana Hills has a junior medical program, the Health and Medical Occupations Academy. The academy is for those who wish to study or pursue a career in medicine, as it prepares students for higher education in the medical field. Participants are involved in field trips, hospital duties, and view medical procedures as they are performed.

SOCSA

The South Orange County School of the Arts (SOCSA), a part of Dana Hills High School, is a visual and performing arts academy for students within the Capistrano Unified School District. Conceived in 1989 by a group of parents, teachers and administrators, the academy was chartered by the District on November 20, 1995.  The pilot program at Dana Hills High School was launched in the Spring semester of 1996.

In October 2000, the SOCSA Foundation was formed to raise funds to support the SOCSA Academy.  In the fall of 2015, the Friends of SOCSA was formed as a replacement non-profit to support the SOCSA Academy.

SOCSA website

Marine Ecology Program
One of Dana Hills' science courses is the Marine Ecology program, which offers a full year of marine science covering both the physical and biological sciences of the ocean and how they work together to form a working Ecosystem. Examples of some of the subjects taught during the class include plate tectonics, waves and tides, ocean currents, sand, algae, plankton, marine mammals, echinoderms, and fish. One of the most well-known traditions of the class is the annual Baja field study. In this field study, students, parents, teachers, and past alumni of the class travel down to Baja, California for a week, usually in May. The purpose of this field study is to apply what the students have learned that year in the class and see it in its natural environment, outside of a conventional laboratory setting. The Baja field study is unique only to that of Dana Hills, and essentially offered nowhere else in the United States.

Notable alumni

 Erik Apple, professional MMA fighter and from the movie Warrior (2011), formerly competing in Strikeforce (mixed martial arts)
 Dana Brown, filmmaker
 Melinda Clarke of The O.C.
 Jose Cortez, center for Greek Team Athens 2003–2009
 Scott Covington, NFL quarterback for the St. Louis Rams and Cincinnati Bengals
Anthony Cumia, one half of the former Opie and Anthony radio show and host of The Anthony Cumia Show on Compound Media.               
 Charlotte Drury, national and international champion trampolinist, Olympic Alternate (Tokyo 2020)
 Jennifer Kessy, Class of ‘94, professional volleyball player, silver medalist 2012 London Olympics
 Ian McCall, wrestler; professional mixed martial artist, retired UFC Flyweight contender
 Fredy Montero professional soccer player
 Kevin Page of Something Corporate
 Brian Ireland of Something Corporate
 Andrew McMahon, lead singer of Jack's Mannequin, Something Corporate, and Andrew McMahon In the Wilderness
 Josiah Johnson, founding member and former vocalist, guitarist, percussionist of The Head and the Heart
 Seth Etherton, Major League Baseball pitcher for the Anaheim Angels and Cincinnati Reds
 Bao Quach, wrestler; professional MMA fighter
 Tanner Scheppers, MLB pitcher for Texas Rangers
 Nicole Brown Simpson, former wife of Heisman Trophy winner/ex-NFL player and actor O. J. Simpson
 Justin South of Augustana
 Kyle Straka of The Growlers
Mimi Walters, U.S. Congresswoman
Luke Williams (2015), baseball player for the San Francisco Giants of Major League Baseball
 Pat O'Connell, professional surfer, star of The Endless Summer II

References

External links
Official website
School Profile
THE PAPER
SOCSA Website

Educational institutions established in 1972
High schools in Orange County, California
Public high schools in California
1972 establishments in California